Zangwal (also known as Twar or Zwangal) is an endangered language spoken in Bauchi State, Nigeria. There were approximately 100 remaining speakers in 1993.

References

Endangered Afroasiatic languages
Languages of Nigeria